Lázaro Núñez-Robres (Almansa 1 June 1827-after 1883) was a Spanish zarzuela and song composer.

References

1827 births
Spanish composers
Spanish male composers
Year of death missing